Irukkangudi is a village in the Virudhunagar district in the South Indian State of Tamil Nadu. It is located 545km (338.647 Mile) southwest of state capital Chennai and 89km (55.302Mile)
south of Madurai.

Villages in Virudhunagar district